Rachel Lardière (born 28 June 1970) is a French Paralympic swimmer who specialises in breaststroke at international level events. She previously practised judo, handball and artistic gymnastics before her accident. 

Lardière became an incomplete paraplegic in February 1988 following an accident with a pommel horse during a gymnastics training session. She has been using a wheelchair since the accident.

References

1970 births
Living people
Paralympic swimmers of France
French female breaststroke swimmers
Swimmers at the 2008 Summer Paralympics
Medalists at the 2008 Summer Paralympics
Paralympic medalists in swimming
Paralympic silver medalists for France
S7-classified Paralympic swimmers
Medalists at the World Para Swimming Championships